Amy Manson (born 9 September 1985) is a Scottish actress.  She has portrayed Alice Guppy in Torchwood, Abby Evans in Casualty, Lizzie Siddal in Desperate Romantics, Daisy Hannigan-Spiteri in Being Human, Medea in Atlantis, and Merida in the fifth season of the ABC fairy tale drama series Once Upon a Time.

Background
Born and brought up in Aberdeenshire, Scotland, Manson has one sister, Ailsa Manson and one brother, James Manson, all of Sept Manson of Clan Gunn. She attended Stage Coach, a Saturday drama school, before leaving home for London at the age of seventeen. She trained at the Central School of Speech and Drama, leaving early to film Pumpkinhead: Blood Feud in Romania. She lives in North London.

Career
Manson made her film debut in Pumpkinhead: Blood Feud, and has also appeared in the horror film Blood Monkey and the short film Smile Emily.

Manson has lent her voice to the radio dramas Lost in Plain Sight, The Summer Walking and The Dead Hour.

On television, she played Alice Guppy in two episodes of Torchwood, and appeared as Abby Evans in nine episodes of Casualty. She has guest-starred in episodes of Doctors, The Bill and My Family.

Manson played Lizzie Siddal, muse, wife and lover of Dante Gabriel Rossetti, in the BBC Two period drama Desperate Romantics. She appeared as the vampire Daisy Hannigan-Spiteri in series two of Being Human, alongside Desperate Romantics co-star Aidan Turner.

Manson played Ginger Corrigan in the 2010 adaptation of Agatha Christie's Marple: The Pale Horse, and also played Fleur Morgan in Outcasts, an eight-part series by Kudos for BBC One.
In 2011, Manson portrayed Leah in the third series of Misfits and Emma "Whirly" Tyson in the BBC drama Young James Herriot.

She also appears in the fifth series of Irish drama Raw.

Awards
Manson won Best Performance (Female) at the 2008 Critics' Awards for Theatre in Scotland, for playing Stepdaughter in the National Theatre of Scotland production of Six Characters in Search of an Author.

Filmography

Television

Film

Theatre

References

External links
 
 Outcasts' Amy Manson: I love being Fearless Fleur!

1985 births
Living people
People from Aberdeenshire
People educated at Westhill Academy
Scottish television actresses
Scottish film actresses
Scottish stage actresses
Scottish radio actresses
Alumni of the Royal Central School of Speech and Drama
21st-century Scottish actresses